Astrid Fanny Granström (born 29 July 2001), known professionally as Nova Miller, is a Swedish singer, song writer, dancer, actress and multi-instrumentalist from Stockholm, Sweden.

Life and career
Miller was born in Stockholm to a musical family. Her mother, Claudia Müller Granström, is a flutist with a master/diploma from the Royal College of Music in Stockholm. She was in several music groups since the mid-90s, of which she has toured with folk rock duo Nordman and as part of folk music trio Frispel. Her father, Johan Granström, is a bassist who has also toured with Nordman and is bandleader for folk rock group Hej Kalle. Her maternal grandparents were both pianists and her paternal grandfather was also a musician and bandleader.

Miller's main instrument, besides her voice, is the guitar. She also plays piano, violin and, to a lesser extent, bass, recorder and ukulele. She has described how she loved attending her parents' big shows as a child and that on one occasion she was allowed to sit with the musicians and watch the show from there, which she thought was so cool. One of her fondest childhood memories involving music is of a little toy violin that a family member had, which would play songs when she pressed the different buttons. She used to pretend that she could play the instrument until she convinced her mother to take her to a proper teacher. Miller subsequently started playing the violin at age four and has danced since she was six. In 2010, she wrote her first song and formed a girl band with her friends, in which she sang and played bass. In 2012, she got her first guitar and took up practicing mainly to help her songwriting, to which she was dedicating more of her time. On 11 March 2013 she performed "Hurt" in Eric Ericsonhallen (the former Skeppsholmen Church), a concert hall located in central Stockholm. On 30 January 2014 she performed "Buses and Trains" at the "Växjö för Filippinernas barn" benefit concert, held in the Växjö concert hall. At the turn of the month February/March 2014, she performed "Buses and Trains", accompanied by her father's band Hej Kalle and Kalle Moraeus, on the annual Barncancergalan (the Childhood Cancer Gala) held at Sälens Högfjällshotell.

In mid-March 2014, Miller (still using the name Fanny Granström) had qualified for the final round in the Under Fifteen category of Helges Talangjakt, held in Gävle, in what was the 20th edition of the annual singing competition, in which Swedish recording artists  Zara Larsson and Molly Sandén among others were discovered at a young age. Miller brought her guitar on stage and performed "Buses and Trains" in the final and was declared winner by the voting jury members. It was around this time in 2014, at age twelve, that she was discovered by British artist, writer and music executive, Lolene (Rothenberg), at Lasse Kühlers dance school in Stockholm. Miller was invited to Lolene's studio, where she again performed "Buses and Trains", which was her favorite song at the time. During this time she attended Nacka musikklasser and later Maestroskolan, two music schools located in Nacka Municipality, near the family home where she grew up.

In the spring of 2015, 21:12 Entertainment signed Miller to Universal Music and on 12 June 2015 she released her debut track "Supernova". The song reached Spotify's viral chart. The lyrics are about "shining your brightest in difficult circumstances", which relates to Miller's experiences with bullying at school and online.

Miller released an original Christmas single 'My Perfect Christmas' on 25 November 2015. The single received highly positive reviews, being named #13 out of 100 Best Christmas songs of all time by Swedish newspaper Expressen.

On 27 May 2016 Miller released the retro pop track "So Good" inspired by James Brown's song "I Got You (I Feel Good)" via 21:12 Entertainment Group. The music video was premiered by MTV on 27 June Popstar! magazine featured the US premiere.

Miller has a five octave vocal range  and starred as the lead in the Swedish show Svansen i kläm. Miller also provided the voice of the fourth Power Puff Girl, Bliss, in the Swedish dub for Cartoon Network.

Nova's second single off her debut EP, "Turn Up The Fire" reached over 11 million views on YouTube and was nominated for 'Pop Song of the Year' at the 2019 Scandipop Awards. The track debuted on On Air With Ryan Seacrest. In October 2019, she released the single "Do It To Myself". In May 2020, she released "Mi Amor". In September, she released "Girls Like Us". In October, she released an EP titled The Passion. In November, she released a Christmas song titled "Red Dress". In December she released another Christmas song titled "Only When It Snows". In August 2021, Nova released the single "apricot skies" featuring Bankrol Hayden as the lead single for her upcoming EP titled Sting. In November, she released the single "done". In January 2022 she released the first single of the year, titled "cold feet".

Influences 
Miller draws inspiration from artists such as Charlie Puth, Mariah Carey, Taylor Swift, Bruno Mars, and Christina Aguilera.

Achievements

Awards and nominations

Appearances 
In 2018, Nova performed on Grattis Kronprinsessan, an annual live television broadcast where notable Swedish artists perform in celebration of Crown Princess Victoria of Sweden's birthday. Nova has also collaborated with Puma on her single "Not Your Number". The campaign was shot by Tim Milgram and features viral dancers Jade Chynoweth, Jojo Gomez and Cache Melvin.

Discography

Extended plays

Singles

Filmography

Television

Voice over roles

References

External links

 

Swedish female dancers
English-language singers from Sweden
Swedish singer-songwriters
Swedish women singer-songwriters
2001 births
Swedish guitarists
Swedish pianists
Swedish women pianists
Swedish violinists
Anti-bullying activists
Living people
21st-century violinists
Singers with a five-octave vocal range
Swedish actresses